John McPhee (1909–1986) was a Scottish professional footballer who played as a winger for Sunderland.

References

1909 births
1986 deaths
Footballers from Stirling
Scottish footballers
Association football wingers
Sunderland A.F.C. players
Brentford F.C. players
Albion Rovers F.C. players
English Football League players